The 2019 Toronto FC II season was the fifth season in the club's history. Having previously competed in the United Soccer League (since rebranded as the USL Championship), this was the club's first season in USL League One, the third tier of professional soccer in the United States.

Current roster

Competitions

USL League One

Standings

Results summary

Results by round

Match Results

References

Toronto FC II seasons
Toronto FC II
Toronto FC II
Toronto FC II